Jason Schimmel (born June 30, 1978) is an American composer, guitarist, musician, recording engineer and producer from Los Angeles, California. He is a founding member of the bands Estradasphere, Red Fiction (formerly known as Atomic Ape), and Orange Tulip Conspiracy. He is an active member in Trey Spruance's Secret Chiefs 3. He has also performed with John Zorn's Masada, J.G. Thirlwell, Neil Hamburger, Amanda Palmer, Michael White, Eyvind Kang, Wayne Horvitz and Jason Webley.

Discography

Estradasphere 
The Pegasus Vault EP (2008) Lobefood
DVD: Palace of Mirrors Live (2007) the End Records
Palace of Mirrors (2006) the End Records
DVD: These are the Days (2005)
DVD: Passion for Life (2004) Mimicry Records
Quadropus (2003) Mimicry Records
Buck Fever (2001) Mimicry Records
The Silent Elk of Yesterday (2001) Mimicry Records
It's Understood (2000) Mimicry Records

Secret Chiefs 3 
Ishraqiyun: Perichoresis (2014) Mimicry Records
Book of Souls: Folio A (2013) Mimicry Records
La Chanson de Jacky / The Western Exile (2012) Mimicry Records
Traditionalists: Le Mani Destre Recise Degli Ultimi Uomini (2009) Mimicry Records
Xaphan: Book of Angels Volume 9 (2008) Tzadik Records
Path of Most Resistance (2007) Mimicry Records
Book of Horizons (2004) Mimicry Records
Book M (2001) Mimicry Records

Atomic Ape 
Swarm (2014) Mimicry Records
Rampage 7" (2014) Mimicry Records

Red Fiction 
Visions of the Void (2020) Tzadik

Other 
Orange Tulip Conspiracy Orange Tulip Conspiracy (2008) Mimicry Records
Amanda Palmer Theatre Is Evil (2012) 8 Ft. Records
Amanda Palmer Who Killed Amanda Palmer (2008) Roadrunner Records
Vladimir Bozar 'n' ze Sharaf Orkestar Universal Sprache (2008) Imago Records
Evelyn Evelyn Evelyn Evelyn (2010) 8 Ft. Records, 11 Records
Neil Hamburger First of Dismay (2014) Drag City
Foetus Soak (2013) Ectopic Ents
Colette Hypnotized (2005) OM Records

Film 
Walk-ins Welcome (2012) Rojée Crumbe Films Inc

References

External links 

1977 births
Living people
American male composers
21st-century American composers
American male guitarists
American record producers
American audio engineers
21st-century American guitarists
21st-century American male musicians